The 2017–18 Pro A season is the 96th season of the Pro A, the top basketball league in France organised by the Ligue nationale de basket (LNB). 

On 2 March 2018, Jeep became the new main sponsor of the league and the league was re-named the Jeep Élite.

Teams

Promotion and relegation
Orléans Loiret Basket and SLUC Nancy Basket were relegated after the 2016–17 season after the teams ended in the last two places. JL Bourg promoted as the regular season champion of the Pro B season. Boulazac Basket Dordogne was promoted as the winner of the Pro B promotion play-offs.

Locations and arenas

Notes
 Team makes its debut in the Pro A.
 The defending champions, winners of the 2016–17 Pro A season.

Regular season
In the regular season, teams play against each other home-and-away in a round-robin format. The eight first qualified teams will advance to the Playoffs, while the last two qualified teams will be relegated to the Pro B.

Standings

Results

Playoffs
The quarter-finals were played in a best-of-three format, while the semi-finals and finals were played in a best-of-five format. The higher seeded team played game one, three and five (if needed) at home. The play-offs began on 22 May 2018.

Bracket

Quarterfinals

|}

Semifinals

|}

Finals

|}

Individual honours

Season awards

MVP of the Month

French clubs in European competitions

See also
2017–18 Pro B season

References

LNB Pro A seasons
French
LNB Pro A